The Terrorism Prevention and Investigation Measures Act 2011  is an Act of the Parliament of the United Kingdom that abolished control orders and provides new powers to allow the Home Secretary to impose restrictions on the behaviour of a specified individual via means of a "TPIM" notice. TPIM notices can include restrictions on movement, financial activity and communication.

Subsequent history

In the wake of the June 2017 London Bridge attack, Iain Duncan Smith spoke on BBC news programme The World At One to point out that the David Cameron coalition government that included Theresa May as Home Secretary had "watered down" the civil powers of the Control Order scheme, which were replaced by the TPIM scheme.  Duncan Smith talked about how Control Orders provided sweeping powers to put terror suspects under house arrest without convicting them while the TPIM scheme allowed enhanced tracking, such as with ankle monitors, but has resulted much less use. The TPIM scheme ended the power of police to force a suspect to live elsewhere: in other words, police could remove someone from their home, far from where they might plot with associates.

References

External links 
 
 Explanatory notes to the Terrorism Prevention and Investigation Measures Act 2011.

United Kingdom Acts of Parliament 2011
Terrorism laws in the United Kingdom
Islamic terrorism in England